Miss USA 1970 was the 19th Miss USA pageant, televised live by CBS from Miami Beach, Florida on May 16, 1970.

The pageant was won by Deborah Shelton of Virginia, who was crowned by outgoing titleholder Wendy Dascomb, also of Virginia – the first time in Miss USA history that a state won back-to-back titles. Shelton went on to place as 1st runner-up at Miss Universe 1970. She later became an actress who appeared in the film Body Double and on a number of television series, including Dallas.

Results

Special awards

Historical significance 
 Virginia wins competition for the second time. Also it is the first time in Miss USA history that a state won back-to-back titles.
 South Carolina earns the 1st runner-up position for the third time. The last time it placed this was in 1956.
 Nevada earns the 2nd runner-up position for the fourth time. The last time it placed this was in 1968.
 Tennessee earns the 3rd runner-up position for the second time. The last time it placed this was in 1952.
 Georgia earns the 4th runner-up position for the third time. The last time it placed this was in 1958.
 States that placed in semifinals the previous year were California, Florida, Nevada, New York, South Carolina, Texas, Virginia and Washington.
 California placed for the fourteenth consecutive year.
 Nevada and Virginia placed for the fourth consecutive year. 
 New York and Washington placed for the third consecutive year. 
 Florida, South Carolina and Texas made their second consecutive placement.
 Arkansas, Ohio and Tennessee last placed in 1968.
 District of Columbia and Oregon last placed in 1967.
 Georgia and Maine last placed in 1959.
 Connecticut, Hawaii and New Mexico break an ongoing streak of placements since 1968.
 Alabama breaks an ongoing streak of placements since 1967.

Delegates
The Miss USA 1970 delegates were:

 Alabama - Kathy Bryant
 Alaska - Therese Press
 Arizona - Alicia Lein
 Arkansas - Mary Jane Dial
 California - Linda Lee Hall
 Colorado - Linda Hicklin
 Connecticut - Patricia Ann Matthews
 Delaware - Marilyn O'Neill
 District of Columbia - Nikki Phillips
 Florida - Cheryl Johnson
 Georgia - Cherie Stephens
 Hawaii - Donna Hartley
 Idaho - Kathy Cravens
 Illinois - Carol Pepoon
 Indiana - Mary McBride
 Iowa - Jacqueline Jochims
 Kansas - Norma Decker
 Kentucky - Joanna Smith
 Louisiana - Nadine Robertson
 Maine - Margaret McAleer
 Maryland - Beckie Price
 Massachusetts - Cheryl Stankiewicz
 Michigan - Daune Bergen
 Minnesota - Sally Strickland
 Mississippi - Susan Ladner
 Missouri - Suzette Grenham
 Montana - Moreen Murphy
 Nebraska - Bonnie McElveen
 Nevada - Sheri Schruhl
 New Hampshire - Gail Eriksson
 New Jersey - Ellen Cream
 New Mexico - Theresa Phillips
 New York - Christina Tefft
 North Carolina - Susan Bodsford
 North Dakota - Nancy Jean Perry
 Ohio - Jane Harrison
 Oklahoma - Evelyn Walkup
 Oregon - Laura Smith
 Pennsylvania - Carol Cerully
 Rhode Island - Rebecca Galleshaw
 South Carolina - Vicki Chesser
 South Dakota - Cynthia Finley
 Tennessee - Donna Marie Ford
 Texas - Diane Swendeman
 Utah - Tamina Roark
 Vermont - Cindy Jurewicz
 Virginia - Deborah Shelton
 Washington - Susan Hyde
 West Virginia - Sharon Alberti
 Wisconsin - Joann Soller
 Wyoming - Ann Swarthout

Judges
Wilhelmina Cooper
Len Dawson
Sue Downey
Hy Gardner
George Lindsey

External links 
 Miss USA official website

1970
May 1970 events in the United States
1970 beauty pageants
1970 in Florida